John Wynne Griffith of Garn (1 April 1763 – 20 June 1834) was a Welsh Whig politician who served as the Member of Parliament (MP) for Denbigh Boroughs from 1818 to 1826. He was elected unopposed at the 1818 general election, re-elected in 1820 with 60 of the 110 votes cast, and did not stand again in 1826.

He was also known as a lichenologist.

Notes

External links
 
Dictionary entry
 http://www.casglwr.org/yrarchif61/68johnwynne.php

1763 births
1834 deaths
Welsh botanists
Whig (British political party) MPs for Welsh constituencies
UK MPs 1818–1820
UK MPs 1820–1826